Anthony John Wolters (born June 9, 1992) is an American professional baseball catcher for the Minnesota Twins organization. He has played in Major League Baseball (MLB) for the Colorado Rockies, Chicago Cubs and Los Angeles Dodgers.

Career

Cleveland Indians
Wolters was drafted by the Cleveland Indians in the third round of the 2010 Major League Baseball draft out of Rancho Buena Vista High School in Vista, California. He signed with Cleveland, forgoing his commitment to play college baseball at the University of San Diego.

Prior to the 2013 season he was moved from an infielder to catcher. After the 2014 season, the Indians added Wolters to their 40-man roster. 

The Indians designated him for assignment before the 2016 season.

Colorado Rockies

The Colorado Rockies claimed Wolters off of waivers. He made his major league debut on April 5, 2016, as a defensive replacement for Nick Hundley. In his first major league at bat, Wolters grounded out off of Jake Barrett. During his first major league start on April 10, 2016, Wolters got his first career hit when he singled against James Shields. In the same game Wolters walked and scored a run for the first time in the big leagues.
Wolters hit his first career home run on June 25, 2016, against Shelby Miller of the Arizona Diamondbacks in the bottom of the 6th inning, scoring Brandon Barnes. For the season he hit .259 with 3 home runs and 30 RBI's and 4 stolen bases.

On April 3, 2017, Wolters was the starting catcher on Opening Day against the Milwaukee Brewers. He went 2–4, scoring the two final runs to take the lead, one in the seventh off an error, and one in the ninth of a double from Alexi Amarista. He struggled offensively throughout the season, ultimately being the backup catcher to Jonathan Lucroy after July. He ended the season hitting .240 in 83 games with no home runs and 16 RBIs.

In 2018, Wolters played in 74 games for the Rockies. In the 2018 NL Wild Card Game, he hit a go-ahead single in the 13th inning of a game the Rockies would win, 2–1 and advance to National League Division Series to face the Milwaukee Brewers. Wolters established career highs offensively in batting average (.262), games played (121) and RBIs (42) in 2019. Wolters slashed .230/.280/.270 in 42 games in 2020. On December 2, Wolters was nontendered by the Rockies.

Pittsburgh Pirates
On February 11, 2021, Wolters signed a minor league contract with the Pittsburgh Pirates organization that included an invitation to Spring Training. On March 30, 2021, Wolters opted out of his minor league contract and became a free agent.

Chicago Cubs
On March 31, 2021, Wolters signed a one-year, major league contract with the Chicago Cubs. On April 14, 2021, Wolters was designated for assignment after Austin Romine was activated off of the injured list. In 3 games for Chicago, Wolters mustered only 5 plate appearances, going hitless with a walk. He was outrighted to the alternate training site on April 17. On April 26, Wolters was again selected to the active roster when Romine was placed on the injured list with a left wrist sprain. After posting a .125/.276/.125 batting line in 30 plate appearances, Wolters was again designated for assignment on May 19. He was outrighted to the Triple-A Iowa Cubs on May 22. He was released on August 3, 2021.

Los Angeles Dodgers
On August 7, 2021, Wolters signed a minor league contract with the Los Angeles Dodgers. He appeared in 26 games for the Triple-A Oklahoma City Dodgers and had a .215 batting average. He remained with Oklahoma City to begin 2022 and was called up to the Majors on August 12. He appeared in two games for the Dodgers, striking out in three of his four at-bats. Wolters was designated for assignment on August 15 and released a few days later. He was quickly re-signed to a new minor league contract. For the 2022 season at Oklahoma City, he played in 61 games with a .230 average. He elected free agency on November 10, 2022.

Minnesota Twins
On January 5, 2023, Wolters signed a minor league contract with the Minnesota Twins.

Personal
Wolters grew up a San Diego Padres fan, with Tony Gwynn being his favorite player.

References

External links

1992 births
Living people
People from Vista, California
Baseball players from California
Major League Baseball catchers
Colorado Rockies players
Chicago Cubs players
Los Angeles Dodgers players
Arizona League Indians players
Mahoning Valley Scrappers players
Carolina Mudcats players
Surprise Saguaros players
Akron RubberDucks players
Peoria Javelinas players
Oklahoma City Dodgers players